Kraskino is an urban locality (an urban-type settlement) in Khasansky District of Primorsky Krai, Russia, located on the shore of the Posyet Bay,  southwest of Vladivostok, near the border with North Korea. Population:

History
It was founded in 1900 as Novokiyevskoye. In 1936, it was given its present name, for Lieutenant Mikhail Kraskin, who died in a border conflict. Urban-type settlement status was granted to it in 1940.

Transportation
In 1992, the Chinese border checkpoint facility at Hunchun-Chenglingzi was opened and in June 1995 the new Chinese-funded and built passenger and cargo border immigration and customs checkpoint at Kraskino on the Russian side was completed. In 1995, a  highway, an upgrade from heavily rutted gravel road, Kraskino (Makhalino station) and Hunchun (Chenglingzi border) was completed. In June 1997, the new Russian Kraskino Customs Office Building was opened. Also, between June 1997 and June 1999 railway infrastructure (marshaling yards, freight handling facilities) was constructed at Makhalino station.

A railway line connecting Jilin Province in China and Vladivostok in Russia, running through Kraskino, began operating in February 2010 and was officially opened on November 26, 2010.

References

Notes

Sources
Приморский крайисполком. "Приморский край.  Административно-территориальное деление на 1 января 1968 г." Дальневосточное книжное издательство. Владивосток, 1968.

Urban-type settlements in Primorsky Krai
China–Russia border crossings